Dmitri Vyacheslavovich Loskov (born 12 February 1974) is a Russian football coach and a former player. He works as an analyst with Lokomotiv Moscow.

A former midfielder, he was often considered Russia's best playmaker in the late 1990s and early 2000s, along with Spartak Moscow's Egor Titov, partly because he is two-footed and has a wide range of passing. He is also a renowned set-piece taker and possesses a fierce, stinging shot.

Loskov is the only individual to have played in all 21 Russian seasons since the dissolution of the Soviet Union in 1991, with 20 of those seasons have been in the Russian Premier League. At one time, Loskov held the record for most appearances in Russian Premier League history (since surpassed by Sergei Semak).

Club career

Rostov
Loskov attended Torpedo Football School in Kurgan in 1983. He moved to Rostov-on-Don football school in 1990 and signed for Rostselmash in 1991. He became a notable midfielder, and Lokomotiv Moscow have shown interest in him, signing a preliminary contract in early 1996. However, Loskov decided to spend one more year with the Rostov club.

Lokomotiv Moscow
In 1997, Loskov transferred to Lokomotiv Moscow. He achieved significant success with the club, winning two Russian Cups, two Russian championships, and becoming the league top goalscorer twice. He played over 200 league matches for Lokomotiv, scoring 100 goals in the Russian Premier League and is the captain of the club since 2006. His high standard of performances has always attracted interest from leading European clubs like Monaco and Tottenham Hotspur. In Europe, Lokomotiv reached the Cup Winner's Cup semi-finals twice (1997–98 and 1998–99) and the Champions League second round (2003–04). Despite being one of the Russian Premier League's most consistent players, he has never showed his best for Russia only managing 25 appearances and 2 goals.

Saturn Ramenskoye
In 2007, Loskov left Lokomotiv for Saturn Ramenskoye, because of a conflict with manager Anatoly Byshovets.

Back to Lokomotiv
On 27 July 2010, Loskov began his second spell with Lokomotiv.

Second return to Lokomotiv
On 24 February 2017, he signed with Lokomotiv as a player once again until the end of the 2016–17 Russian Premier League season. He started his farewell match as a captain on 13 May 2017 in a game against FC Orenburg before being ceremoniously substituted after 13 minutes of play.

Coaching career
On 5 October 2021, he was appointed caretaker manager of Lokomotiv, following the resignation of Marko Nikolić.

Loskov served as caretaker manager for 0–4 Russian Cup loss to FC Yenisey Krasnoyarsk on 3 March 2022. For the next league game, he was replaced by Oleg Pashinin in the position. For the game against PFC CSKA Moscow on 12 March 2022, Loskov again served as caretaker. He returned to the assistant position after the appointment of Zaur Khapov as a new manager on 4 April 2022. On 5 April 2022, Lokomotiv announced that Loskov left the coaching staff and will continue to work at the club in different position.

Career statistics

Club

International

International goals
Scores and results list Russia's goal tally first.

Honours

Lokomotiv Moscow
Russian Premier League (2): 2002, 2004
Russian Cup (3): 1999–2000, 2000–01, 2006–07
Russian Super Cup (2): 2003, 2005

Individual
Futbol's Footballer of the Year (2): 2002, 2003
Sport-Express's Russian Premier League Best Player (1): 2002
Russian Premier League top scorer (2): 2000, 2003
Sport-Express's Russian Premier League Best Central Midfielder (2): 2000, 2005
Sport-Express's Russian Premier League Best Attacking Midfielder (4): 1999, 2002, 2003, 2004

References

 Railway worker's dossier, Bronepoezd 
 Dmitri Vyacheslavovich Loskov, loskomotiv.ucoz.ru 
 Russian Premier League Squads & Stats 2006, rsssf.com
 Russia – Record International Players, rsssf.com
 BBC Sport – Tottenham Hotspurs transfer rumour, news.bbc.co.uk
 World Footballers profile, worldfootballers.com/

1974 births
Living people
People from Kurgan, Kurgan Oblast
FC Rostov players
FC Lokomotiv Moscow players
FC Saturn Ramenskoye players
FC Lokomotiv Moscow managers
Russian footballers
Russia international footballers
UEFA Euro 2004 players
Russian Premier League players
Association football midfielders
Russian football managers
Russian Premier League managers
Sportspeople from Kurgan Oblast